Jung Gun-joo (born May 26, 1995) is a South Korean actor. He has starred in several web dramas before venturing into TV broadcasts.

Career 
In 2017, Jung Gun-joo signed an exclusive contract with JYP Entertainment and made an appearance in DAY6's music video "I Like You". He starred in a web-drama by Naver "Flower Ever After".
 
In 2019, Jung joined Blossom Entertainment and acted as one of the main cast of Extraordinary You.

Personal life 
Jung served in the mandatory military service at the age of 21 during his university days. And he has a barista license based on his experience working part-time at a coffee shop.

Filmography

Film

Television series

Web series

Web shows

Music video

Awards and nominations

References

External links 
 
 
 

Living people
South Korean male television actors
South Korean male web series actors
21st-century South Korean male actors
1995 births